Putāruru is a small town in the South Waikato District and the Waikato region of New Zealand's North Island. It lies on the western side of the Mamaku Ranges and in the upper basin of the Waihou River. It is on the Oraka Stream 65 kilometres south-east of Hamilton. State Highway 1 and the Kinleith Branch railway run through the town.

Name 
The town gets its name from a historic event which occurred nearby. Korekore a granddaughter of Raukawa, the founder of the Ngāti Raukawa iwi, was murdered by her husband Parahore. Her servant Ruru witnessed her murder and escaped into the forest where he hid and waited for Parahore and his men to give up their pursuit of him. The place where he exited the forest was named "Te Puta a Ruru" or "the exit of Ruru". This was eventually shorted to Putāruru.

History and culture

Pre-colonial history

There were several Māori settlements in the  Putāruru district in pre-colonial times. Ngāti Raukawa is the main tribe or iwi in the area and Ngāti Mahana is the hapū (subtribe) within  Putāruru. During Te Rauparaha's migration to the Cook Strait area in the 1820s, many Ngāti Raukawa people moved from these settlements to Rangitikei and Manawatu localities, and others followed after the Siege of Ōrākau in 1864. Te Kooti and his followers were pursued through the district early in 1870 by a force under Lt-Col. Thomas McDonnell.

European settlement
The Patetere Block, containing the future town site of  Putāruru, was acquired from the Māori in the 1860s. In the early 1880s large areas in the  Putāruru district came into the possession of the Patetere Land Company, and from 1883 much of this land passed into the hands of the Thames Valley Land Company. Roadmaking commenced in the late 1880s, but the railway, begun by the Thames Valley and Rotorua Railway Co., was the most important factor in the progress of settlement in the area.

The first settler in the district bought his section in 1892.

In the 1880s  Putāruru consisted of little more than a hotel and a blacksmith shop. 

Exotic afforestation was begun in the district some time after 1910 by a land and timber company with an outlet to the Hamilton-Rotorua railway near Pinedale. Commercial tree planting with Pinus radiata took place between 1924 and 1928 on the Pinedale Block. Milling began in 1940–41 and by 1951 the area had been cut out and replanted. Larger areas further south were planted in 1924 for future milling and to provide the raw material for pulp and paper manufacture. The town of  Putāruru was surveyed in 1905 and on 18 December an area of 50,987 acres (206 km2), which had been acquired from the Thames Valley Land Co. by the Crown and included town allotments in  Putāruru and Lichfield, was opened by ballot.

The history of the local timber industry is preserved in the New Zealand Timber Museum.

Much of the land in the  Putāruru district suffered from a cobalt deficiency, which made farming practically impossible, but since 1935 measures have been taken to restore fertility, and farming has expanded.  Putāruru was created a town district in 1926, and on 1 July 1947 it was constituted a borough.

Railways 

The Thames Valley and Rotorua Railway line reached Oxford (Tīrau) on 8 March 1886 and Putāruru and Lichfield,  further south-east, on Monday 21 June 1886. New Zealand Railways Department (NZR) took over the line on 1 April 1886.

In March 1887 the contract for the  Putāruru-Ngātira section of the line to Rotorua was let to Daniel Fallon, work had begun by April 1887 and the whole branch opened on 8 December 1894. Putāruru was then served by the Rotorua Express. It had a refreshment room and a bookstall and, from 1907, the railway yard had a  turntable and handled much livestock, as well as timber. The refreshment room, run by the hotel until 1919, burnt down in 1925 and was replaced by a room to the south of the main building, which closed in 1968.

The station closed to passengers on 12 November 1968 and freight on 10 December 2002, though it was served by the Geyserland Express from 1991 to 2001. The station was demolished during March and April 2013. Only a signals equipment shelter and a passing loop now remain on the station site.

In the early 1900s the Taupo Totara Timber Company acquired bush blocks north and north-west of Lake Taupō and erected a mill at Kopokorahi, near the present Kinleith (Tokoroa). A bush tramway was constructed linking that mill with the Mokai Mill, 51 miles (82 km) south-east of  Putāruru. By 1905 logs were transported to Putāruru via this line, and by 1908 passengers and goods. The dismantling of this line began in 1944 but in 1946 the Ministry of Works purchased it and in 1948 it began rebuilding the 18 miles (29 km) between Putāruru and Kinleith as a New Zealand Government Railways branch line to serve the new Kinleith Mill for pulp and paper production. This was completed on 6 October 1952.

Taumangi railway station 
It was just south of Taumangi Road. In 1923 Taumangi Road was diverted north, when a bridge replaced the former level crossing.

Taumangi opened on the same day as Putāruru, 8 March 1886. In 1925 it was noted that inwards traffic was of timber, shingle, gravel, coal, 13 loads of manure, a wagon of lime, hardware and small goods. The public siding closed on 8 September 1941, as it was in a poor condition, but the station remained open for passengers until 22 November 1948, and for parcels, and roadside traffic until 30 July 1951. There is now only a single line through the station site.

Marae

The  Putāruru area has two marae, affiliated with the hapū of Ngāti Raukawa:

 Mangakāretu Marae and Ngā Hau e Maha meeting house are affiliated with Ngāti Ahuru
 Whakaaratamaiti Marae and Korōria meeting house are affiliated with Ngāti Ahuru and Ngāti Mahana

In October 2020, the Government committed $1,259,392 from the Provincial Growth Fund to upgrade Mangakāretu Marae, Whakaaratamaiti Marae and 6 other Ngāti Raukawa marae, creating 18 jobs.

Bent St. Skate Park 
One of Putaru's most prominent features is it historical skate-bowl park. It was built in the 1980s, as one of the first skate parks in the country, and was recently chosen for a major refurbishment project. This community-led project is set to receive $550,000 from the South Waikato District Council in order to facilitate its upgrade. Intended upgrades include additional skating features, court area, and seating area.

Demographics

Putāraru had a population of 4,314 at the 2018 New Zealand census, an increase of 369 people (9.4%) since the 2013 census, and an increase of 384 people (9.8%) since the 2006 census. There were 1,626 households, comprising 2,088 males and 2,229 females, giving a sex ratio of 0.94 males per female. The median age was 44.0 years (compared with 37.4 years nationally), with 888 people (20.6%) aged under 15 years, 684 (15.9%) aged 15 to 29, 1,740 (40.3%) aged 30 to 64, and 1,005 (23.3%) aged 65 or older.

Ethnicities were 73.8% European/Pākehā, 34.8% Māori, 3.3% Pacific peoples, 4.6% Asian, and 1.4% other ethnicities. People may identify with more than one ethnicity.

The percentage of people born overseas was 13.0, compared with 27.1% nationally.

Although some people chose not to answer the census's question about religious affiliation, 48.5% had no religion, 36.2% were Christian, 3.6% had Māori religious beliefs, 0.7% were Hindu, 0.5% were Muslim, 0.6% were Buddhist and 1.5% had other religions.

Of those at least 15 years old, 297 (8.7%) people had a bachelor's or higher degree, and 1,041 (30.4%) people had no formal qualifications. The median income was $23,600, compared with $31,800 nationally. 309 people (9.0%) earned over $70,000 compared to 17.2% nationally. The employment status of those at least 15 was that 1,371 (40.0%) people were employed full-time, 450 (13.1%) were part-time, and 201 (5.9%) were unemployed.

Rural surrounds

Putāruru Rural had a population of 2,373 at the 2018 New Zealand census, an increase of 150 people (6.7%) since the 2013 census, and an increase of 135 people (6.0%) since the 2006 census. There were 840 households, comprising 1,173 males and 1,200 females, giving a sex ratio of 0.98 males per female. The median age was 35.7 years (compared with 37.4 years nationally), with 552 people (23.3%) aged under 15 years, 456 (19.2%) aged 15 to 29, 1,092 (46.0%) aged 30 to 64, and 273 (11.5%) aged 65 or older.

Ethnicities were 87.6% European/Pākehā, 18.7% Māori, 2.1% Pacific peoples, 2.7% Asian, and 3.2% other ethnicities. People may identify with more than one ethnicity.

The percentage of people born overseas was 13.5, compared with 27.1% nationally.

Although some people chose not to answer the census's question about religious affiliation, 53.0% had no religion, 35.4% were Christian, 0.6% had Māori religious beliefs, 0.4% were Hindu, 0.3% were Buddhist and 1.3% had other religions.

Of those at least 15 years old, 243 (13.3%) people had a bachelor's or higher degree, and 378 (20.8%) people had no formal qualifications. The median income was $38,300, compared with $31,800 nationally. 312 people (17.1%) earned over $70,000 compared to 17.2% nationally. The employment status of those at least 15 was that 984 (54.0%) people were employed full-time, 333 (18.3%) were part-time, and 45 (2.5%) were unemployed.

Economy

Putāruru's economy is based on farming, forestry and timber production.

The nearby Blue Spring is the current source of about 70% of New Zealand's bottled water. Much of the town's water comes from the spring, which is on the Waihou River to the north east.

Education

All these schools are co-educational. Rolls are as of

Notable people

 Grant Fox  (born 1962), former All Black
Honey Hireme (born 1981), former New Zealand rugby player
 Glen Mitchell (born 1972), Olympic cyclist
 Lorraine Moller (born 1955), Olympic athlete
 Gareth Morgan (born 1953), economist, philanthropist
 Jennifer Robyn (Jenny) Shattock, former South Waikato mayor
 Wayne Smith (born 1957), former All Black and former All Black coach

References

External links 
 1914 and 2011 photos of railway station
1932 photo of brick water tank at the railway station
 New Zealand Timber Museum

Populated places in Waikato
South Waikato District